Sofie Petersen (born 1955) is a Greenlandic Lutheran bishop.

She was born on 23 November 1955 in Maniitsoq, Greenland, Kingdom of Denmark. She studied theology and graduated from the University of Copenhagen in 1986. On 28 May 1995, at the age of 39, Petersen was ordained as the Bishop of Greenland in the Evangelical Lutheran Church in Denmark. She was ordained at Hans Egede Church, the cathedral of Greenland in the presence of Queen Margrethe II. She is the second Inuit bishop and the second woman to become a bishop in the Danish Lutheran church.

Petersen is an outspoken advocate for climate justice. She retired in December 2020.

References

External links
Article about Sofie Petersen, Indigenous Communion

1955 births
Greenlandic women
Greenlandic Inuit people
Greenlandic Lutheran clergy
Living people
Women Lutheran bishops
People from Maniitsoq
People from Nuuk
University of Copenhagen alumni
Climate activists
Indigenous women